Linard is a former commune in the Creuse department in the Nouvelle-Aquitaine region in central France. On 1 January 2019, it was merged into the new commune Linard-Malval.

Geography
A farming area comprising the village and a few small hamlets situated some 12 miles (19 km) north of Guéret near the D6 and its junction with the D56 road. The Petite Creuse river forms the southern boundary of the commune's territory.

Population

Sights
 The church of St. Martin, dating from the fourteenth century.
 Traces of the Château-Gaillard.
 The fifteenth-century chapel of the convent de Boisferry.

See also
Communes of the Creuse department

References

Former communes of Creuse
Populated places disestablished in 2019